The Mercedes-Benz Axor is a truck manufactured by Daimler Truck between 1999 and 2014 designed to fill the gap between the premium Actros tractors and the mostly rigid Atego trucks and was targeted at fleet customers. The model was succeeded by the Mercedes-Benz Antos in 2012 in Germany, but is still produced in Brazil, Turkey (at Aksaray), Indonesia (at Wanaherang) and India (by BharatBenz at Oragadam).

The truck has a relatively simple manual gear-shift, or alternatively, the Electronic Power Shift (EPS), is available, as well as a fully automatic box. The truck is powered by a 12-litre straight 6 engine (OM457LA), or 6.4-litre straight 6 engine (OM906)

2005 facelift
Originally the Axor was only available as a tractor but with the 2005 facelift, former Atego models over 18t were made part of the Axor Range.

Models 
Tractor

 Axor 4028 T (GVW 16T, 280hp)
 Axor 4928 T (GVW 25T, 280hp)
 Axor 3340 S (GVW 33T, 401hp)

Rigid

 Axor 2528 R (GVW 25T, 280hp)
 Axor 2523 R/ 45 (GVW 25T, 231hp)
 Axor 2523 R/ 57 (GVW 25T, 231hp)
 Axor 1623 R/ 51 (GVW 16T, 231hp)
 Axor 1623 R/ 60 (GVW 16T, 231hp)

See also 

 BharatBenz
 Daimler Truck
 Mercedes-Benz Actros

References

External links 

Axor
Vehicles introduced in 2001
Cab over vehicles